"Calling" is a song by Japanese rock band Coldrain. It was released as the second single from the band's seventh studio album Nonnegative, written by frontman Masato Hayakawa and lead guitarist Ryo Yokochi, and produced by Michael Baskette. It was released on 17 April 2022 to coincide with the band's fifteenth anniversary.

Background 
On 16 April 2022, the band held a live stream on their YouTube channel to celebrate their fifteenth anniversary as a band. During the livestream, the band's seventh studio album Nonnegative was announced alongside the second single "Calling" which was then released subsequently released at midnight on 17 April 2022 half an hour later to coincide with the band's fifteenth anniversary. They later debuted the song for the first time live at Viva La Rock in Saitama at the Saitama Super Arena.

Composition and lyrics 
"Calling" has been described by critics as a nu metal, metalcore, and a hard rock song. The song runs at 120 BPM and is in the key of A major. It was written by frontman Masato Hayakawa and lead guitarist Ryo Yokochi and produced by Michael Baskette, and runs for three minutes and 27 seconds. The song was written about the band's journey and their connection with the fanbase throughout their career to commemorate their fifteenth anniversary as a band. Morecore described the song as "emotional and powerful."

Speaking to V13.net, Hayakawa elaborated on his thoughts about "Calling":

Track listing

Music video
The official music video for "Calling" was released on 17 April 2022 and was directed by Koh Yamada.

The video starts off with the band getting out of a van and making their way through a warehouse where the band make t-shirt prints filled with the song's lyrics in a studio room. This is accompanied by visual references to the band's fifteenth anniversary throughout while also showcasing archival footage of old studio recording sessions and live shows the band has performed at throughout their career, including their performance at Blare Fest which is all intertwined with the band performing "Calling" in the abandoned warehouse. 

As of January 2023, the music video for "Calling" has over 350K views on YouTube.

Personnel  
Credits adapted from Tidal.

Coldrain

 Masato Hayakawa – lead vocals, lyrics, composition, arrangements
 Ryo Yokochi – lead guitar, programming, composition, arrangements
 Kazuya Sugiyama – rhythm guitar, arrangements
 Ryo Shimizu – bass guitar, arrangements
 Katsuma Minatani – drums, arrangements

Additional personnel
 Michael Baskette – producer, mixing, arrangements
 Brad Blackwood — mastering
 Jef Moll — recording engineer
 Joshua Saldate – assistant engineer

Charts

References 

Coldrain songs
2022 songs
2022 singles
Warner Music Group singles
Songs written by Masato Hayakawa
Song recordings produced by Michael Baskette
Nu metal songs
Metalcore songs
Hard rock songs